Frank Riley may refer to:

 Frank Riley (athlete) (1887–1950), American athlete
 Frank Riley (author) (1915–1996), pseudonym of Frank Rhylick, an American science fiction author
 Frank E. Riley (1865–?), member of the Wisconsin State Assembly
 Frank M. Riley (1875–1949), architect of Madison, Wisconsin

See also
Frank Reilly (disambiguation)